Minuscule 403 (in the Gregory-Aland numbering), ε 320 (in Soden's numbering), is a Greek minuscule manuscript of the New Testament, on cotton paper. Palaeographically it has been assigned to the 13th century. 
It has marginalia.

Description 

The codex contains the text of the four Gospels on 212 paper leaves with numerous lacunae. It is written in one column per page, in 22 lines per page.

 Contents
Matthew 12:23-19:12; 19:18-28:20; Mark; Luke 1:1-5:21; 5:36—24:53; John 1:1-18:36.

Text 

The Greek text of the codex is a representative of the Byzantine text-type. Hermann von Soden classified it to the textual family Kx. Kurt Aland did not place it in any Category.

According to the Claremont Profile Method it represents textual family Kx in Luke 1 and Luke 20. In Luke 10 no profile was made.

History 

The manuscript was added to the list of New Testament manuscripts by Scholz (1794–1852).
C. R. Gregory saw it in 1886.

The manuscript is currently housed at the Biblioteca Nazionale Vittorio Emanuele III (Ms. II. A. 4) in Naples.

See also 

 List of New Testament minuscules
 Biblical manuscript
 Textual criticism

References

Further reading 

 

Greek New Testament minuscules
13th-century biblical manuscripts